Acanthocercus margaritae, is a species of lizard in the family Agamidae. It is a small lizard found in Namibia and Angola.

References

Acanthocercus
Reptiles described in 2021
Taxobox binomials not recognized by IUCN